Jacques Adam Drielsma
(14 October 1886 – 31 July 1974) was a Surinamese lawyer and notary who served as acting Prime Minister of Suriname in 1951, and Finance minister between 1949 and 1952. In 1957, he was sentenced to two years in prison for embezzlement.

Biography

Drielsma was born on 14 October 1886 in Amsterdam from a Surinamese mother and a Frisian father. After receiving his  (non-academic law degree) in Suriname in 1916, he started to work as a lawyer. On 1 June 1926, he became a notary and successor to Da Costa who had retired.

Drielsma was first elected to the Colonial States in 1923. and served until 1930. On 27 June 1949, he became Minister of Finance in the cabinet of Julius Caesar de Miranda. In January 1952, he resigned due to a conflict of interest, because the Vervuurts Bank of which he was a commissioner was in bankruptcy court.

On 5 April 1951, he was appointed acting Prime Minister of Suriname, and served until 4 June 1951, when he was succeeded by Jan Buiskool.

Drielsma's notary office went bankrupt in 1956 with a debt of ƒ 1.15 million (about US$6.2 million in 2021). His notary office also acted as a mortgage bank where people could deposit their money at interest. About 400 people had an account at his office. On 27 July 1957, he was sentenced to two years imprisonment for embezzlement.

Drielsma died on 31 July 1974 in Paramaribo, at the age of 87.

Honours 
 Officer of the Order of Orange-Nassau (1930).

Notes

References 

1886 births
1974 deaths
Prime Ministers of Suriname
Lawyers from Amsterdam
Politicians from Amsterdam
Finance ministers of Suriname
Politicians convicted of embezzlement
20th-century Surinamese lawyers
Surinamese criminals
Heads of government who were later imprisoned
Officers of the Order of Orange-Nassau